Christine Jones (born 1963 in New Zealand) is a Norfolk Islander lawn bowls international.

Bowls career

World Championship
In 2020 she was selected for the 2020 World Outdoor Bowls Championship in Australia.

Commonwealth Games
She competed for Norfolk Island at the 2018 Commonwealth Games in the Gold Coast, Queensland.

Asia Pacific
Jones won a pairs bronze medal at the 2015 Asia Pacific Bowls Championships in Christchurch, New Zealand.

References

Living people
Bowls players at the 2018 Commonwealth Games
Norfolk Island sportspeople
New Zealand female bowls players
1963 births
People from Marton, New Zealand
Commonwealth Games competitors for Norfolk Island
Norfolk Island bowls players